Halieutopsis andriashevi, also known as Andriashev's deepsea batfish, is a species of fish in the family Ogcocephalidae.

It is found in the Western Indian Ocean in the vicinity of the Mascarene Islands.

Etymology
The fish is named in honor of Anatole P. Andriashev.

References

Ogcocephalidae
Marine fish genera
Fish described in 1988
Taxa named by Margaret G. Bradbury